is a 1973 Japanese drama film directed by Kei Kumai. It was entered into the 24th Berlin International Film Festival.

Cast
 Tatsuya Nakadai as Sakuzo
 Kinya Kitaoji as Asao, Haruko's lover
 Keiko Takahashi as Haruko, Sakuzo's daughter (as Keiko Sekine)
 Shin Saburi as Inashiro
 Natsuyo Kawakami
 Yôsuke Kondô as Koyama
 Kappei Matsumoto
 Yukiko Takabayashi

Release
Rise, Fair Sun was released theatrically in Japan on 27 October 1973 where it was distributed by Toho.

Footnotes

Sources

External links

1973 films
1973 drama films
Films directed by Kei Kumai
1970s Japanese-language films
Toho films
1970s Japanese films